The Westfield School is a private Christian school in Perry, Georgia, United States. It is located off U.S. Highway 41 South. It educates students in grades PK-12, in three schools.

The Westfield School was originally founded as the Perry Christian Day School as part of the segregation academy movement against the federal court-ordered integration of Houston County public schools.

History

Perry Christian Day School was established in 1969 as a segregation academy. It changed its name to the Westfield Schools in 1971 and to the Westfield School in 2007.

The lower school, middle school, high school, arts and sciences building, administrative building, and another building that houses the cafeteria, gym, weight room, coaches' offices, dressing rooms, and three computer labs are all part of the 28-acre (11 ha) campus.

References

Private high schools in Georgia (U.S. state)
Educational institutions established in 1969
Schools in Houston County, Georgia
Private middle schools in Georgia (U.S. state)
Private elementary schools in Georgia (U.S. state)
Christian schools in Georgia (U.S. state)
1969 establishments in Georgia (U.S. state)
Segregation academies in Georgia